The 1923-24 Brooklyn Wanderers F.C. season was the second season for the club in the American Soccer League. The club finished the season in 5th place but won the Southern New York Football Association Cup.

American Soccer League

Pld = Matches played; W = Matches won; D = Matches drawn; L = Matches lost; GF = Goals for; GA = Goals against; Pts = Points

National Challenge Cup

American Football Association Cup

Southern New York State Football Association Cup

Notes and references
Bibliography

Footnotes

Brooklyn Wanderers F.C.
American Soccer League (1921–1933) seasons
Brooklyn Wanderers F.C.